Scorch may refer to:

Entertainment
 Scorch, a dragon puppet character created by Ronn Lucas
 Scorch (TV series), a 1992 CBS sitcom starring the Ronn Lucas character
 Scorch (comics), a.k.a. Aubrey Sparks, an antagonist of Superman
 Scorch (Transformers), a character in the Turbomasters line of Transformers
 Scorch Supernova, a character in the film Escape from Planet Earth
 Scorch, the discontinued mascot of the Adirondack Flames

Video games

 Scorch, a soldier equipped with a flame weapon in the Army Men series
 Scorch, a dragon character in Dungeon Siege
 Scorch, a character in The Lost Vikings 2: Norse by Norsewest
 Scorched Earth (video game), sometimes abbreviated as Scorch
 Scorch, the boss of the Evening Lake world in Spyro: Year of the Dragon
 RC-1262 "Scorch", a character in Star Wars: Republic Commando

Science and technology
 Surface discoloration caused by combustion or heat
 Bacterial leaf scorch, a disease state caused mainly by a xylem-plugging bacterium 
 Leaf scorch, browning of plant tissues
 In sulfur vulcanization of rubber, premature vulcanization
 Microsoft System Center Orchestrator

Other uses
 Charles O. Hobaugh (born 1961), NASA astronaut with the call-sign "Scorch"
 Sibelius Scorch, a web browser plugin for the music scorewriter program Sibelius

See also
 Burn (disambiguation)
 Scorched (disambiguation)
 Scorcher (disambiguation)